Steven A. LeBlanc (born 1943) is an American archaeologist and former director of collections at the Peabody Museum of Archaeology and Ethnology at Harvard University's Peabody Museum.

He is the author a number of books about Southwest archeology and prehistoric warfare.  His books have run counter to the once widespread notion of peaceful preliterate cultures. However, he continues that tradition in asserting that all preliterate cultures were similar, with the same cultural responses to being stressed.

Azar Gat expresses similar arguments in the first chapters of War in Human Civilization (Oxford UP, 2006).

Criticism
Some scholars have disputed the claim that all primitive peoples in the American Southwest were warlike.  The archaeologists Paul and Suzanne Fish have concluded that there is minimal evidence of conflict in the Hohokam regions.  Todd Bostwick has argued that the hilltop sites most likely had religious or astronomical rather than military purposes.  Ann Hibner Koblitz, a historian and professor of gender studies, surveyed the work of LeBlanc and his followers, and wrote:

In a section of Koblitz's article titled "Looking-Glass Logic," she criticizes two arguments that LeBlanc and others have advanced. First, she writes that "it is illogical to assume, as LeBLanc and his followers do, that the existence of an unpopulated or sparsely populated area between two population centers necessarily proves that those two populations were ever at war." She points out that there is a depopulated region between Phoenix and Tucson today, yet the two cities "are not now nor have they ever been at war."  Second, she writes that "just because trade disputes can sometimes be a cause of war, it does not follow that evidence of complicated trade patterns means that war must have been a common occurrence."

Publications

Explanation in Archeology, with Patty Jo Watson and Charles L. Redman. Columbia University Press. 1971. Translated into Spanish as En Metodo cientifico en arqueologia 1974. Alianza Universidad Press, Madrid.
An Archeological Synthesis of South Central and Southwestern New Mexico, with Michael E. Whalen and contributions by R. Anyon, P.A. Gilman, P.E. Minnis, D. Rugge and M. Nelson. Office of Contract Archaeology. University of New Mexico, Albuquerque. 1979
Vandalism of Cultural Resources: The Growing Threat to Our Nation's Heritage, with Dee F. Green (eds.) Cultural Resource Report No. 28, U.S.F.S. Southwestern Region, Albuquerque. 1979
The Mimbres People: Ancient Painters of the American Southwest. Thames and Hudson. London, New York. 1983
Mimbres Pottery: Ancient Art of the American Southwest, with J.J. Brody and Catherine J. Scott. Hudson Hills Press, New York. 1983
The Galaz Ruin: A prehistoric Mimbres village in Southwestern New Mexico, with Roger Anyon. Contributions by Paul Minnis, James Lancaster and Margaret C. Nelson. University of New Mexico Press, Albuquerque. 1984
Archeological Explanation, with Patty Jo Watson and Charles Redman. Columbia University Press, New York. 1984
Short-Term Sedentism in the American Southwest: The Mimbres Valley Salado, with Ben A. Nelson. Contributions by James W. Lancaster, Paul E. Minnis, and Margaret C. Nelson. The University of New Mexico Press, Albuquerque. 1986
Girikihaciyan: A Halaf site in Southeastern Turkey, with Patty J. Watson. Institute of Archaeology, University of California, Los Angeles. 1990
Prehistoric Warfare in the American Southwest. University of Utah Press. Salt Lake City. 1999
"Early Pithouse Villages of the Mimbres Valley and Beyond: The McAnally and Thompson Sites in their Cultural and Ecological Contexts, with Michael W. Diehl", Papers of the Peabody Museum of Archaeology and Ethnology. Vol. 83. Harvard University. 2001
Deadly Landscapes: Case Studies in Prehistoric Southwestern Warfare. editor with Glen Rice. University of Utah Press. 2001
Constant Battles: The Myth of the Peaceful, Noble Savage with Katherine E. Register. St. Martin’s Press. New York. 2003. Translated into Estonian as: Lakkamatud taplused: Müüt Rahumeelsest ja õilsast metslasest. Olion: Tallinn 2004.
Painted by a Distant Hand: Mimbres Pottery from the American Southwest, Peabody Museum Collection Series, Peabody Museum of Archaeology and Ethnology, Harvard University. 2004
Symbols in Clay: Seeking Artists’ Identities in Hopi Yellow Ware Bowls with Lucia Henderson",  Papers of the Peabody Museum of Archaeology and Ethnology, Vol. 84. Harvard University. 2009

References

External links

1943 births
Living people
American archaeologists